Naval Base Subic Bay was a major ship-repair, supply, and rest and recreation facility of the Spanish Navy and subsequently the United States Navy located in Zambales, Philippines. The base was 262 square miles, about the size of Singapore. The Navy Exchange had the largest volume of sales of any exchange in the world, and the Naval Supply Depot handled the largest volume of fuel oil of any navy facility in the world. The naval base was the largest overseas military installation of the United States Armed Forces, after Clark Air Base in Angeles City was closed in 1991. Following its closure in 1992, it was transformed into the Subic Bay Freeport Zone by the Philippine government. 

In late 2022, plans to reopen the base under the Enhanced Defense Cooperation Agreement emerged after the Philippine Navy reoccupied a portion of the base and a U.S. investment firm purchased the remainder of the port.

Spanish period
Subic Bay's strategic location, sheltered anchorages, and deep water had first been made known when the Spanish explorer Juan de Salcedo reported the bay's existence to the Spanish authorities upon his return to Manila after Salcedo arrived in Zambales to establish the Spanish crown. It would be a number of years before the Spanish would consider establishing a base there.

Cavite, which had been home to most of the Spanish fleet in the Philippines, suffered from unhealthy living conditions and was vulnerable in time of war and bad weather because of its shallow water and lack of shelter.  Therefore, a military expedition was sent to Subic Bay in 1868 with orders to survey the bay to find out if it would be a suitable site for a naval yard. The Spanish explored the entire bay and concluded that it had much promise and thus reported their findings to Cavite. This report was not well received in Manila, as the Spanish command was reluctant to move to the provincial isolation of Subic. Finally, in 1884, a Royal Decree declared Subic Bay as a naval port.

On 8 March 1885, the Spanish Navy authorized construction of the Arsenal de Olongapo and by the following September, work started at Olongapo.  Both the harbor and its inner basin were dredged and a drainage canal was built, as the Spanish military authorities were planning to make Olongapo and their navy yard an "island."  This canal also served as a line of defense and over which the bridge at the base's Main Gate passes.  When the Arsenal was finished, the gunboats Caviteño, Santa Ana, and San Quintín were assigned for its defense. To complement these gunboats, coastal artilleries were planned for the east and west ends of the station, as well as on Grande Island.

Seawalls, causeways and a short railway were built across the swampy tidal flats.  To finish these projects, thousands of tons of earth and rock from Kalalake in Olongapo had to be brought in as fill. The magnitude of this quarrying was so huge that a hill eventually disappeared and became a lagoon in the area now known as Bicentennial Park.

The main entrance to the Arsenal was the West Gate, which still stands. This gate was equipped with gunports and also served as a jail. This gate was connected to the South Gate, which was near the water front, by a high wall of locally quarried stone.

Inside the Arsenal, the Spanish constructed a foundry, as well as other shops, which were necessary for the construction and repair of ships. The buildings were laid out in two rows on Rivera Point, a sandy patch of land jutting into the bay, and named after the incumbent Captain-General of the Philippines, Fernando Primo de Rivera. The Arsenal's showpiece was the station commandant's headquarters, which was a one-storey building of molave and narra woods, and stood near today's Alava Pier and had colored glass windows.

The Spanish navy yard was constructed in the area that was last occupied by the U.S. Naval Ship Repair Facility.

Battle of Manila Bay

On 25 April 1898, Commodore George Dewey, Commander of the United States Asiatic Fleet, received word that war with Spain had been declared and was ordered to leave Hong Kong and attack the Spanish fleet in Manila Bay.

In the Philippines, Rear Admiral Patricio Montojo, realizing that Subic Bay would provide a more defensible position than Cavite, ordered his smaller ships and the batteries in Manila Bay to resist Dewey's fleet and deny them the entrance to Manila Bay.  His other units would then use Subic Bay as a sally port, with which he could attack the American fleet's rear and cut off its supplies. On 26 April, Montojo arrived at Subic Bay aboard  with seven other ships.

On the morning of the 27 April, Castilla was towed northeast of Grande Island to help control the western entrance to Subic Bay.  The eastern entrance, which was between Grande and Chiquita Islands, had been blocked by the scuttling of San Quintín and two other vessels. On Grande Island, the four  Ordóñez guns that had been shipped from Sangley Point were not yet installed.  Meanwhile, a cable-laying ship, which was commandeered to lay mines, ended up putting only four of the 15 available mines in place.

In Hong Kong, Dewey purposely delayed his sailing until he received news from the U.S. Consul at Manila, Oscar F. Williams, with information about the strength and positions of the Spanish fleet.  Williams told Dewey that Montojo and his fleet had sailed to Subic Bay.

After seeing no enemy vessels at Subic, Boston and Concord signaled  of their findings and rejoined the squadron underway to Manila.

At dawn of 1 May 1898, the American fleet entered Manila Bay. Once the ships closed to within  of the Spanish fleet, Dewey ordered the Captain, Charles Gridley, of Olympia "You may fire when you are ready, Gridley." Montojo's fleet was destroyed, losing 167 men killed and 214 wounded. The Americans only suffered a handful of wounded.

In June 1898, nearly a thousand Spanish nationals left Olongapo and took refuge at Grande Island. By July, Dewey ordered  and Concord to sail for Subic Bay to demand the surrender of Grande Island.  When the American ships arrived, they saw the German cruiser  at the island, but as the Americans cleared for action and started to head for Irene, she fled around the other end of Grande.  The Spanish garrison on the island did not resist and immediately surrendered to Captain Joseph Coghlan of Raleigh.

Philippine–American War
During the Philippine–American War, the Americans focused on using the Spanish naval station at Sangley Point, largely ignoring Subic Bay, and the arsenal was occupied by Filipino forces. The Filipinos constructed a gun battery on top of a ridge using one of the  guns on Grande Island.

In the summer of 1899, gunboats started patrolling Subic Bay and after realizing that the patrols would not stop, the Filipinos started to prepare to confront the Americans. During a routine patrol, the supply ship  entered Subic Bay and came under fire from the newly constructed battery. Zafiro withdrew to Cavite and reported the incident to headquarters. The cruiser  was then sent to Subic to silence the battery, but as she was withdrawing, the battery gave out one last shot, provoking the Americans.

On 23 September 1899, Charleston, Concord, and Zafiro sailed into Subic Bay to destroy the battery. Upon clearing Kalaklan Point, Monterey, equipped with  guns, opened fire. Under this barrage, the battery was only able to fire one shot.

Charleston then sent a signal for 180 sailors and 70 Marines to land on Subic. Meanwhile, the other ships continued firing. The Filipinos then deployed into the town of Olongapo, returning fire with small arms. When the entire landing force was ashore, the ships ceased firing and the landing party entered the battery. In all, three charges of guncotton were placed on the battery, completely destroying it. The party then went back to their ships and sailed for Manila. While the battery was destroyed, the Filipino forces still held the navy yard as well as Olongapo.

In December 1899, the U.S. Army launched an operation to clear the countryside of Filipinos who were resisting American rule; 90 soldiers from the 32d U.S. Volunteers set out to capture Olongapo. As the soldiers were entering Santa Rita, just outside Olongapo, they met a pocket of resistance, but after returning fire, the armed Filipinos quickly scattered. The soldiers then proceeded to capture the navy yard.

When the ships arrived, Watson was surprised that the U.S. Army was in complete possession of the navy yard. Watson then ordered Marine Captain John Twiggs Myers ashore with 100 Marines to secure the navy yard.

When the Marines found the highest flagpole on the navy yard, which was in front of the hospital, they immediately raised the American flag on 10 December 1899, one year after the Treaty of Paris was signed. The Marines then took responsibility for the navy yard while the Army took over administrative and operational control of Olongapo.

Drinking water was not available on the navy yard and so water details had to be sent to the village of Binictican, near the mouth of the river of the same name. Early during the occupation of Olongapo, the town was offered as a place of refuge for Filipinos who were sympathetic to the Americans. After an ambush of seven Marines, the inhabitants of the villages of Binictican and Boton were ordered to move into Olongapo or be declared outlaws. Those people who owned property in the two villages were given houses in Olongapo. Six days after the villagers settled in Olongapo,  shelled Binictican and Boton and later 100 Marines completed the destruction.

The Marines then exercised civil authority over Olongapo and ordered municipal elections, appointed local policemen, gave away food to supplement poor harvests, supplied medical care and supplies, and set up a school for the teaching of the English language.

In 1900, the General Board of the United States Navy made a thorough study of the naval base building program and decided that the American fleet in the Philippines could be easily bottled up in either the Manila or Subic bays. They instead recommended Guimaras Island, south of Manila, as the most suitable site for the main American naval base in the Philippines. Admiral of the Navy George Dewey and Admiral George C. Remey, Commander of the Asiatic Fleet, disagreed. They thought Subic Bay held the greatest potential.

The Navy then called for another study with Remey as the senior member. This board then decided that Subic Bay was the most suitable and practicable place to build a naval base. A board of officers under Rear Admiral Henry C. Taylor was then appointed to develop a plan for the naval station. Extensive plans for fortifications, dockyards, drydocks, workshops, a hospital, a railroad linking Olongapo with Manila and storage facilities for 20,000 tons (18,000 metric tons) of coal were drawn up and submitted to the Congress.

The board requested an appropriation of $1 million ($ in  dollars) to begin building the naval station. President Theodore Roosevelt, a strong supporter of the establishment of a naval station at Subic Bay, issued an Executive Order establishing the Subic Bay Naval Reservation.

Because of the establishment of the Subic Bay Naval Reservation in November 1901 more troops were assigned to Subic. When the Samar force returned at the beginning of March 1902, its personnel were divided between Olongapo and Cavite. Cavite, however, still continued to have the largest number of Marines anywhere in the Philippines and continued to be the headquarters of the U.S. Navy because of its proximity to Manila.

In December 1902, Rear Admiral Robley D. Evans, Commander of the Asiatic Fleet, directed the first fleet exercise in Asian waters. An expeditionary force of 200 Marines occupied and erected guns on Grande Island. The channels on each side of the island were mined, while vessels of the fleet operated in the bay itself. The exercise was highly successful and confirmed the Admiral's opinion of the strategic advantage of Subic Bay.

The value of Subic Bay as a training area was recognized as the Marines practiced movements in wild and difficult environment. Their building of bridges and roads was also considered to be excellent training.

In June 1907, as tensions with Japan mounted, orders were secretly issued for Army and Navy forces in the Philippines to concentrate at Subic Bay. A large supply of coal and certain advanced base materials including coastal defense guns were to be moved from Cavite. This plan, however, would be opposed by other military leaders and by Governor-General Leonard Wood. An acrimonious debate would emerge and plans to build a major base in the Philippines would be discarded. Roosevelt would be disappointed by this, wrote that the aforementioned decision was a humiliating experience, and instead pushed for the development of Pearl Harbor in Hawaii.

World War I and interwar years

In 1917, as the United States was drawn into World War I, all the Navy's shipyards including Subic Bay began working at a feverish pace to prepare ships for sea.  American and Filipino workers would take pride in their workmanship such that destroyers that were overhauled in Subic Bay became the vanguard of Admiral William Sims's convoy.

The Washington Naval Treaty of 1922 called for the limitation of naval armaments and included provisions that facilities for the repair and maintenance of American naval forces in the Philippines would be reduced.  Shops were dismantled at the navy yard at Subic Bay and Fort Wint was reduced to caretaker status and personnel levels were cut.

The Japanese government kept a close eye on activities in the Philippines for violations of the 1922 treaty.  During the typhoon season of 1928, VT Squadron Five which operated Martin torpedo aircraft out of Manila, arrived in Subic Bay on a routine training flight.  A typhoon suddenly veered toward Subic Bay and the plane crews had to lay down ramps to haul the seaplanes up on the beach.  The pontoons were filled with water and the planes lashed down.  When the typhoon had passed, the undamaged planes were refloated and returned to their tenders at Manila.

Within three weeks, the squadron commander was informed of a Japanese complaint that the Navy had violated the treaty by increasing the facilities for plane handling at Subic Bay.  The squadron commander was to provide all facts concerning the incident to the Office of the Governor-General of the Philippines so that a response could be made to the Tokyo government.

Even though the facilities at Subic Bay were greatly reduced under the Coolidge administration, some ship repair capability remained, including the Dewey Drydock.  The Great Kantō earthquake occurred on 30 August 1923, devastating the Yokohama, Japan region. The transport ship Merritt set sail from Subic Bay in 72 hours loaded with Red Cross relief supplies and 200 Filipino nurses.

In the 1930s a tree-planting program had begun, transforming the naval station into a virtual tropical garden, with streets lined with coconut palms, hibiscus, and gardenias.  Outside activities and sports were also promoted, with a golf course being laid out where Lowry Hall last stood.

World War II
By the mid-1930s, the Nazis had taken power in Germany and Japan was beginning to flex its military muscle. The United States Congress therefore authorized the release of funds with which to update the Coast Defenses of Manila and Subic Bays. President Franklin D. Roosevelt would complement this by ordering the integration of Filipino military forces into the newly created U.S. Army Forces in the Far East. General Douglas MacArthur, who had been serving as a military advisor to the government of the Commonwealth of the Philippines and was also Field Marshal of the Philippines, was ordered back to active duty with the rank of Lieutenant General with the title of Commander of the United States Army Forces in the Far East.

To prepare for eventual war, Dewey Drydock, which had been at Subic Bay for 35 years was towed to Mariveles Bay, on the tip of the Bataan Peninsula, and scuttled there on 8 April 1942 to prevent the Japanese from deriving benefit from it.

The 4th Marine Regiment, which had been withdrawn from Shanghai in China, was ordered to withdraw to the Philippines.  The first members of the regiment disembarked from President Madison at Subic Bay early on the morning of 1 November 1941.  The remainder arrived on 1 December.  The Marines were housed in temporary wooden barracks and in tents at the naval station and the rifle range.

The freshly arrived Marines were assigned to provide land defense for Subic Bay. Seaward defenses included the batteries at Fort Wint on Grande Island and a minefield, which had been laid off the entrance to Subic Harbor. As the Marines built beach defenses, Consolidated PBY-4 Catalinas from VP-101 and VP-102 of Patrol Wing 10, which was stationed at Subic Bay, were conducting daily patrols off Luzon as a response to rumors that the Japanese were approaching the Philippines. On 11 December, seven Catalinas had just returned from patrol when Japanese Zeroes appeared and strafed the aircraft. One ensign was killed and all Catalinas sank to the bottom of Subic Bay's inner basin.

As the Japanese continued their advance through Luzon, telephone and telegraph lines between Manila and Olongapo were sabotaged; as a result, all Japanese in Olongapo were rounded up and turned over to the Provost Marshal. A priest had also been questioning Marines and Filipinos about sensitive matters such as troop positions and strength and after the Marines became suspicious, a search of the priest's belongings was ordered and a shortwave radio was found. Right there and then, the battalion commander convened a hearing and after intense interrogation, the priest confessed to being a member of the German-American Bund and had been a spy for the Japanese.  He was then taken behind the church and shot by a Marine firing squad.

By 24 December, the situation at Subic had become hopeless and an order to destroy the station and withdraw was given. All buildings on the station were torched while Filipinos burned the entire town of Olongapo.  All that remained on Subic was the former , and she was towed into a deep part of the bay and scuttled.  All Marines withdrew to Bataan and eventually to Corregidor where they made their last stand.

Fort Wint, under the command of Colonel Napoleon Boudreau of the U.S. Army, was evacuated on 25 December.  All equipment and supplies were destroyed.  On 10 January 1942, soldiers of the Japanese Imperial Army's 14th Infantry Division marched into Olongapo and on 12 January, the Japanese commandeered native fishing boats to seize Grande Island.  Subic Bay Naval Station was established with four companies of soldiers and a company of Kempeitai.

Within one week of the Japanese's occupation of Subic Bay and Grande Island, American PT boats at Cavite were ordered to attack a Japanese ship, which was anchored at Subic Bay, that was shelling American positions. PT-31 and PT-34 entered the bay separately. PT-31 suffered engine trouble and ran aground on a reef. She was abandoned and destroyed. PT-34 entered undetected and sunk a  transport that was off-loading supplies. She then came under heavy fire but managed to escape undamaged. PT-32 was then ordered into Subic Bay and attacked and hit a light cruiser on 1 February. On 17 February, PT-34 made a final but unsuccessful attack at Subic Bay after which all PT boats were ordered to leave the Philippines.

To protect Subic Bay, the Japanese garrisoned Fort Wint with anti-aircraft artillery and automatic weapons but did not repair the American guns nor build permanent fortification. The Japanese then started shipbuilding at Subic Bay and began constructing wooden auxiliary vessels. Several hundred workers from occupied-China and Formosa were brought in as laborers, in addition to 1,000 Filipinos.  Nine ships were built and shipped to Cavite for engine installation, however, none of the ships would see active service as they were destroyed by U.S. Navy aircraft.

One of the few buildings that were left standing from the bombing and subsequent torching of the station was the Catholic Church. The Japanese removed all religious articles and converted it into a movie theater and was later used to imprison Americans and Filipinos that had been captured. Those who died were buried behind the church in a common cemetery. When all the prisoners were shipped to Manila, the Japanese used the church as a stable for horses.

On 20 October 1944, four U.S. Army divisions aboard 650 U.S. Navy vessels landed at Palo, Leyte, fulfilling MacArthur's promise to return to the Philippines. On 13 December, the Japanese began evacuating civilians and non-essentials from Manila aboard Ōryoku Maru and four other merchant ships. As the ship was heading for Japan, fighter aircraft from the aircraft carrier  attacked the ships and left hundred of Japanese dead or wounded. Ōryoku Maru, heavily damaged with destroyed steering gear, pulled into Subic Bay. Throughout the night, the Japanese disembarked while the American and Allied prisoners, that were carried below decks, were left aboard. The next morning, Japanese guards ordered the prisoners to come up on deck. As Navy aircraft began to strafe the ships, the prisoners started frantically running about. As the pilots approached, they recognized the white shapes as Americans or Allies and sharply pulled up, rocking their wings in recognition. Afterwards, the 1,360 surviving Allied prisoners were forced to strip and swim ashore where they were crowded into a fenced tennis court near the Spanish Gate. Early the next morning, three fighters scored two direct hits on Oryoku Maru and she burst into flames. When the planes had left the Japanese served the prisoners their first meal since leaving Manila two days before: two teaspoons of dry, raw rice. There was only one faucet from which the water trickled out so slowly that a prisoner was lucky if he managed one drink every 18 hours. Roll call was taken each morning. Those that had died during the night were buried in an improvised cemetery next to the seawall. After four days at Subic, only 450 survived the makeshift prison; they were subsequently sent to the labor camps in Japan.

By January 1945, the Japanese had all but abandoned Subic Bay. The U.S. Fifth Air Force had dropped 175 tons of bombs on Grande Island evoking only light fire from the skeleton Japanese force manning the anti-aircraft guns. The commander of Japanese forces in the Philippines, General Tomoyuki Yamashita, had withdrawn his forces into defensive mountain positions and ordered Colonel Sanenbou Nagayoshi to block Highway 7 near Subic Bay.

On 29 January, 40,000 American troops of the 38th Division and 34th Regimental Combat Team came ashore without resistance at San Antonio, Zambales, by the site of what became known as the San Miguel Naval Communications Station. The column advanced toward Subic Bay, meeting their first resistance at the bridge spanning the Kalaklan River near the Olongapo Cemetery. The Japanese, knowing that they would imminently lose the town, decided to destroy Olongapo. Eventually, the Japanese evacuated the town and the 34th Regiment took over. The following day, Grande Island was taken and Navy minesweepers began clearing the bay. Engineers of the 38th Division remained in Olongapo to begin reactivation of Subic Bay Naval Station.  Bridges, buildings and the water distilling plant were repaired and the beaches and streets were cleared. Soon enough, LSTs were making dry-ramp landings near the town of Subic.

While Army engineers were busy around Subic Bay, the remaining troops moved east along Highway 7, planning to cross the base of Bataan to meet elements of the Army's XIV Corps, which were moving west on the same road. On the morning of 31 January 1945, the Americans began climbing the forested hills of Zig Zag Pass and into a hornet's nest of Japanese. In the first three days at Zig Zag Pass the U.S. 152nd had more casualties than during 78 days of combat in Leyte. General Henry L. C. Jones was relieved and command of the 38th was given to General Roy W. Easley who used P-47s for air support. The planes began an intensive strafing and bombing of the jungle and dropped napalm on the Japanese positions. After 15 days of fighting the enemy positions were finally overrun. The Japanese had succeeded in their mission to slow the American advance but lost more than 2,400 troops. American losses had been 1,400 killed.

After the war

Subic Bay was designated Naval Advance Unit No. 6, and became a submarine and motor torpedo boat base shortly after the Philippines were liberated.   arrived on 11 February 1945 and found Subic Bay " ...a primitive, humid, unhealthy, desolate Siberia far from the pleasant climate, facilities, and girls of Australia... ". A Naval Supply Depot was established at Maquinaya, about 3 miles (5 km) from the main base in July 1945.  A new town of Olongapo was built to replace building burned by the retreating Japanese and provide housing for Filipino civilians employed at the base.  Olongapo and its 9,000 Filipino residents remained under United States Navy administration when the remainder of the Philippines became independent on 4 July 1946.

Construction of Naval Air Station Cubi Point began during the Korean War.  The town of Banicain was demolished to build the airfield, and its residents were relocated to Olongapo.  As Olongapo's population grew to 60,000, Filipinos requested control of the town.  On 7 December 1959, 56,000 acres of land with electrical, telephone and water utilities was relinquished to Philippine control.  Grande Island was converted to a recreation center for naval personnel; and most of the historic Coastal Artillery guns of Fort Wint were moved to United States coastal defense parks in 1963 and 1968.

Vietnam War

The Vietnam War was the period of peak activity as Subic Bay became the U.S. Seventh Fleet forward base for repair and replenishment after the Gulf of Tonkin incident in 1964. The average number of ships visiting the base per month rose from 98 in 1964 to 215 by 1967. The base, with 6 wharves, 2 piers, and 160 mooring points and anchorages, had about 30 ships in port on any given day. The record of 47 ships in port was set in October 1968. About one-third of these were Military Sea Transportation Service ships bringing 45,000 tons of food, ammunition, and supplies and 2 million barrels of fuel oil, aviation gasoline, and JP-4 jet fuel each month including fuels transferred to Clark Air Base via a  pipeline. The Naval Supply Depot maintained an inventory of 200,000 parts. The 4,224,503 sailors visiting Subic Bay in 1967 purchased more than $25 million in duty-free goods from the Navy Exchange.

More than $63 million of construction projects contracted between 1964 and 1968 did not prepare the Ship Repair Facility (SRF) for the increasing workload and emergency peaks generated by the war.  American military and civilian population totaled about 4,300; and more than 15,000 Filipino SRF workers worked 12-hour shifts for an average of over 60 hours per week.  The physical plant consisted of quonset huts put up after World War II; and workers used obsolete tools and equipment supplemented by machine tools made available by decommissioning the New York Navy Yard.  Additional floating drydocks and a third repair ship were assigned from the United States to increase the capabilities of the repair facility.

The fire-ravaged  was repaired in August 1967 before her return to the United States for a complete overhaul.

The Royal Australian Navy destroyer  was repaired at Subic following the attack by USAF aircraft on 17 June 1968.

A Joint Australian/U.S. Board of Inquiry convened on 9 June in the library of George Dewey High School, the same day the stern section of Frank E. Evans arrived under tow by a tug. It was stripped and towed to sea as a gunnery target.

Harbor Clearance Unit One was activated at Subic Bay in 1966 with the mission of salvaging ships from the rivers and harbors of Vietnam. Two of the biggest jobs were the salvaging of SS Baton Rouge Victory from the Saigon River and the raising of the  dredge Jamaica Bay from the Mỹ Tho River. Both jobs were accomplished despite continuous harassment by enemy sniper fire.

NAS Cubi Point served as the primary maintenance, repair and supply center for the 400 carrier based aircraft of the Seventh Fleet's carrier force. The jet engine shop turned out two jet engines a day to keep pace with the demands of the air war in Vietnam.

Following the Fall of Saigon in the summer of 1975 hundreds of thousands of refugees fled Vietnam. Thousands of these refugees were rescued at sea by U.S. Navy ships and taken to Subic Bay. A temporary processing center that handled thousands of refugees was set up on Grande Island in 1975. They were later taken to the Philippine Refugee Processing Center in Morong, Bataan.

The Military Bases Agreement of 1947 was amended in 1979, changing the role of the Americans at Subic Bay from landlord to guest. Philippine troops assumed responsibility for the perimeter security of the base to reduce incidents between U.S. military and Philippine civilians. The unhampered operation of U.S. forces was assured. The U.S. granted the Philippines $500 million in military sales credits and supporting assistance.

Pinatubo eruption

On 15 June 1991, the second largest volcanic eruption of the 20th century occurred when Mount Pinatubo, just 20 miles (32 km) from Subic Bay, exploded with a force eight times greater than the Mount St. Helens eruption. The sun was nearly completely hidden as volcanic ash blotted it out.  Volcanic earthquakes and heavy rain, lightning and thunder from Typhoon Yunya passing over northern Luzon resulted in a 36-hour period of complete chaos.

By the morning of 16 June, when the eruption subsided, Subic Bay lay buried under  of rain-soaked, sandy ash.

Buildings everywhere collapsed under the weight of the coarse gray ash.  Two girls, one a nine-year-old American and the other a Filipino citizen, died when trapped under a falling roof at George Dewey High School.  In the city of Olongapo, more than 60 volcano-related deaths were reported, including eight who were crushed when part of Olongapo General Hospital collapsed.

That night, the threat of continued eruptions combined with the lack of water and electricity led to the decision to evacuate all dependents. U.S. warships and cargo planes began the emergency evacuation of thousands of Navy and Air Force dependents. Seven Navy ships sailed Monday, 17 June, with 6,200 dependents. The evacuees were taken by ship to Mactan Air Base and then were airlifted by U.S. Air Force C-141 Starlifters to Andersen Air Force Base at Guam. After the dependents were evacuated, an intense clean-up was begun. All hands, American service members and Filipino base employees, worked around the clock to restore essential services. Clark Air Base, much closer to Mount Pinatubo, was covered with tons of ash after the eruption. It was declared a total loss and plans for a complete closure were started.

Restoration of base

Within two weeks NAS Cubi Point was back in limited operation.  Soon, most buildings had electricity and water restored.  By mid-July service had been restored to most family housing units. The dependents began returning 8 September 1991 and by the end of the month almost all were back at Subic Bay from the United States. In September 1991, more than twenty thousand Filipino civilians were employed by the base.

Closure due to disagreements in leasing costs 
From 1988 to 1992, the US Government and Philippine government tried to renegotiate the terms of an extension of the military bases at Subic and Clark. This referred to the Military Bases Agreement of 1947, which was due to expire. Intense negotiations between the governments of the United States and the Philippines began. These negotiations resulted in the Treaty of Friendship, Peace and Cooperation between the United States and the Republic of the Philippines. This would have extended the lease of the American bases in the Philippines. However, a bone of contention remained the amount of money that the US Government would pay to the Philippine government for the lease and use of the bases.

As per C.R. Anderegg, the Vice Commander of Clark Air Base, Philippines wanted $825 million per year for a period of seven years, but the U.S. Government would not budge from the earlier agreed $360 million per year for 10 years. This was not the first such hike demanded by the Philippines - in 1984, a similar hike had been asked and given for Clark Air Base. However, this time, the US government did not agree.

On 13 September 1991, the Philippine Senate rejected the ratification of this treaty.

In December 1991, the two governments were again in talks to extend the withdrawal of American forces for three years but this broke down as the United States refused to detail their withdrawal plans or to answer if nuclear weapons were kept on base. Additionally, the United States offered only one quarter of the $825 million in rent sought by the Filipino Government. Finally on 27 December, President Corazon Aquino, who had previously fought to delay the U.S. pullout to cushion the country's battered economy, issued a formal notice for the U.S. to leave by the end of 1992. Naval Station Subic Bay was the U.S.'s largest overseas defense facility after Clark Air Base was closed.

Conversion into an SEZ and merchant port
In 1992, tons of material including drydocks and equipment, were shipped to various Naval Stations. Ship repair, maintenance yards and supply depots were relocated to other Asian countries including Japan and Singapore. This withdrawal marked the first time since the 16th century that no foreign military forces were present in the Philippines. The departure of the United States Navy left a huge clean-up to be completed. Soil and water was contaminated with asbestos, PCBs and pesticides. As of 2012, clean-up estimates for Subic Bay Naval Base and Clark Air Base were $40 million each.

Beginning in June 2012, the Philippine government said that the United States military could use the old base with prior approval by the Philippine government. This follows expanded military ties between the two nations and an American pivot towards Asia. This follows a Visiting Forces Agreement made in 1999, that saw annual visits of United States forces to conduct large scale exercises (known as Balikatan) between the two allies. The Sydney Morning Herald reported on 20 November 2012 that Subic Bay will host US ships, Marines and aircraft on a semi-permanent basis which according to analysts will give the US a strategically important force posture for its shift in emphasis to the Pacific.

The US Navy began using the base in Subic Bay in 2015 to deliver materiel and personnel for annual joint military exercises. Some 6,000 US personnel came to Subic in April, and returned for exercises in 2016 in agreement with Philippine authorities. US ships have used Subic Bay as a resupply port during routine calls.

Reopening 
In 2022, the United States and Philippine governments quietly began preparations for U.S. forces to return to the facility amid heightened tensions with China. The portion of Redondo Peninsula which was used by HHIC Phil was acquired by the national government in late 2022 and named a Naval Operation Base (NOB) through the Philippine Navy. After the remainder of the port came up for sale, and interest from at least two Chinese companies, U.S. private equity firm Cerberus Capital Management acquired the port. On November 9, U.S. Ambassador MaryKay Carlson visited Subic Bay. On November 24, a day before the 30th anniversary of the U.S. Navy's departure, Rolen Paulino, chairman of the SBMA, said that he would be "very surprised" if Subic Bay does not return to service as a U.S military facility through the Enhanced Defense Cooperation Agreement, as "during war, time is of the essence."

Commanders 
This is the Official list of Base Commanders who served the Subic Naval Base from 1945 to 1992. Base commanders prior to 1945 are not included.

See also
Other former United States Navy installations:
 Naval Air Station Cubi Point
 U.S. Naval Hospital, Subic Bay
 U.S. Naval Radio Facility Bagobantay
 U.S. Naval Station Sangley Point
 San Miguel Naval Communications Station
 Mount Santa Rita Naval Link Station
 US Naval Base Philippines
 US Naval Advance Bases

Notes

Sources
 Anderson, G. R. Subic Bay From Magellan to Pinatubo (2009) Gerald Anderson

External links

Harbor Clearance Unit One – Salvors
Revisiting Subic Bay Naval Base
Education Primary
News Source
 Source of more information about Subic Bay

Installations of the United States Navy in the Philippines
Military facilities in Zambales
Military facilities in Bataan
Buildings and structures in Olongapo
Military installations established in 1885
1885 establishments in the Philippines
1992 disestablishments in the Philippines
Military installations closed in 1992
Closed installations of the United States Navy